Kohneh-ye Jadid (also Romanized as Kohneh-ye Jadīd) is a village in Bid Shahr Rural District, Evaz District, Larestan County, Fars Province, Iran. At the 2006 census, its population was 291, in 56 families.

References 

Populated places in Evaz County